Tom Kimmel (born Thomas Eugene Hobbs II in 1953) is an American singer-songwriter and poet.

Biography
Born in Memphis, Tennessee, Kimmel grew up largely in small towns in south Alabama. He attended public schools and graduated from the University of Alabama in 1975.

Kimmel is known as a songwriter, and his compositions have been recorded by many popular artists, including Johnny Cash, Waylon Jennings, Linda Ronstadt, Joe Cocker and Randy Travis. His songs have also been featured in television series including Miami Vice, Touched by an Angel and Dawson's Creek — and in films including Twins, Runaway Bride and Serendipity.

"That's Freedom", the lead track on his 5 to 1 album, was co-written by Kimmel and gave him a Billboard Hot 100 hit as a solo artist. The song later became a Top 10 hit for Australian singer John Farnham in late 1990.

He usually tours as a solo performer, and occasionally tours with The Sherpas, a trio he formed in 1994 with Michael Lille and Tom Prasada Rao. A new trio, The New Agrarians, was recently formed with Pierce Pettis and Kate Campbell.  He also sings sporadically with songwriters Don Henry and Sally Barris, collectively called The Waymores.

He frequently teaches songwriting and creative expression at retreats and workshops, and in 2006, he published his first book of poems. He currently resides in Memphis, Tennessee.

Discography 
 1987 – 5 to 1  No. 104 US
 1990 – Circle Back Home 
 1993 – Don’t Look Back 
 1994 – Bones 
 1999 – Short Stories 
 2002 – Shallow Water
 2003 – Honor Among Thieves (with The Sherpas)
 2004 – Light of Day

Bibliography 
 2006 – The Sweetest and the Meanest (book)
 2008 – The Sweetest and the Meanest

References

External links 
 Official Homepage
 Tom Kimmel on MySpace
 Tom Kimmel at Discogs

1953 births
American male poets
American singer-songwriters
American male singer-songwriters
Living people
University of Alabama alumni